John Anthony Quitman (September 1, 1798 – July 17, 1858) was an American lawyer, politician, and soldier. As President of the Mississippi Senate, he served one month as Acting Governor of Mississippi (from December 3, 1835,	to January 7, 1836) as a Whig. He was elected Governor in 1850 as a Democrat, and served from January 10, 1850, until his resignation on February 3, 1851, shortly after his arrest for violating U.S. neutrality laws. He was strongly pro-slavery and a leading Fire-Eater.

According to Quitman's first biographer, John F. H. Claiborne, writing in 1860, "A more ambitious man never lived. ...He was greedy for military fame." "For Quitman, military glory and political ambition had priority over management of his three plantations and numerous slaves."

Early life

Born at Rhinebeck, New York, in 1798, Quitman studied classics at Hartwick Seminary, graduating in 1816. He was an instructor at Mount Airy College, Pennsylvania, but decided to study law.

He was admitted to the bar in 1820 and moved to Chillicothe, Ohio. He moved south to Natchez, Mississippi the following year. He purchased Monmouth in 1826, and it would remain in his family for the next 100 years. It was an archaeological dig site investigated by Dr. Montroville Dickeson during his 10-year study of the Natchez Indians of the Mississippi River Valley.

Plantation and enslaver
Quitman owned four plantations: Springfield, which he purchased in 1834, on the Mississippi River near Natchez, a cotton plantation and dairy farm; Palmyra (Warren County, Mississippi), which he acquired through marriage (cotton); Live Oaks (Terrebonne Parish, Louisiana, sugar and molasses); and Belen (Holmes County, Mississippi, cotton).

He did not personally manage the plantations, a task entrusted to (white) overseers. Not counting house servants, at Palmyra, he enslaved 311 people under sixty years of age in 1848; at Live Oaks, 85 in 1850; at Springfield, 39 in 1842; and at Belen, 32 in 1858.

One favored enslaved person accompanied him on his expedition to Mexico. Being frequently absent, Quitman was unaware of slave resistance and did not plan for slave revolts. "Neither he nor his family entertained second thoughts about the propriety or morality of their holding blacks in bondage." He "genuinely believed that owner-slave relations were harmonious. ...The Quitmans lived to the very eve of the Civil War virtually oblivious of the dangers of slave rebellion and believing, as Quitman put it, that Southern society was 'based upon a more solid foundation' than Northern society."

Politics
Quitman practiced law in Natchez until 1826 when he was elected to the Mississippi House of Representatives. He became Chancellor of the state in 1828 and served on the state's Constitutional Convention in 1832. He was the protégé of John C. Calhoun during the Nullification Crisis.

In 1835, he was elected to the State Senate, becoming President of the Senate the following year. He also served as Acting Governor of Mississippi. In 1838, he became a judge on the High Court of Errors and Appeal. Quitman was the grand master of the Mississippi Masons from 1826 to 1838 and again from 1840 to 1845.

He was initiated to the Scottish Rite Masonry till his elevation to the 33rd and highest degree.

Mexican–American War

On July 1, 1846, during the Mexican–American War, Quitman was made a Brigadier General of Volunteers. He commanded a brigade under Zachary Taylor in northern Mexico.

After the Battle of Monterrey, he was sent to join Winfield Scott's expedition.  He led the 2nd Brigade in the Volunteer Division during the Siege of Veracruz, and on April 14, 1847, he was promoted to Major General in the Regular Army.

Following the battle of Cerro Gordo, General Robert Patterson returned to the United States with other Volunteer soldiers whose enlistments had expired. Reinforcements from Veracruz, including about 300 U. S. Marines, were organized into a new brigade under Colonel Samuel E. Watson. Shields' and Watson's brigades were designated the 4th Division, with Quitman in overall command.

By this point, Quitman had gained a reputation as a competent military commander and enjoyed affectionate respect from volunteer and professional soldiers alike.

Quitman led his division to the Valley of Mexico, where he was posted to guard the supply depot, hospital, and horse teams.  Frustrated at his supporting role, Quitman was nevertheless ordered to send reinforcements to the front. At the battles of Contreras and Churubusco, Shields' brigade was actively engaged, though Quitman was not personally involved.

He commanded the southern assault during the battle of Chapultepec.  U.S. Marines of Quitman's division spearheaded the attack, and their involvement in this battle is remembered in the opening line of the Marines' Hymn. Quitman received the surrender of the citadel in Mexico City.

After the fall of Mexico City, General Scott named Quitman as the Military Governor of Mexico City for the remainder of the occupation. He was the only American to rule from within the National Palace of Mexico. Quitman was a founding member of the Aztec Club of 1847. He was discharged on July 20, 1848, and served as Governor of Mississippi in 1850 and 1851.

Filibustering

It was in his capacity as governor of Mississippi that Quitman was approached by the Venezuelan filibuster Narciso López to lead his expedition of 1850 to liberate Cuba from Spanish rule. He turned down the offer because of his desire to complete his term as governor but did offer assistance to López in obtaining men and materials for the expedition. López's effort failed, and the repercussion led to Quitman's being charged with violations of Neutrality Act of 1817 and his resignation from the post of the governor so that he could defend himself. The charges were dropped after three hung juries allowed him to avoid conviction.

With the encouragement of President Franklin Pierce, Quitman, with assistance from later Confederate General Mansfield Lovell, began preparations in July 1853 for a filibuster expedition of his own. The preparations to invade Cuba were nearly complete, with several thousand men prepared to go, when in May 1854, the administration reversed course and undertook steps to stop what it had almost put into motion, presumably because it felt that in the wake of the furor over the passage of the Kansas–Nebraska Act, the action to add slave territory such as Cuba would cause irreparable damage to the Democratic Party in the North.

Return to politics
On March 4, 1855, Quitman was elected to the Thirty-fourth Congress for the Democratic Party and served in that and the ensuing Congress until his death. In Congress, he was Chairman of the Committee on Military Affairs.

Death
John A. Quitman died at his home, "Monmouth," near Natchez, Mississippi, on July 17, 1858, aged 58, apparently from the effects of National Hotel disease, which he contracted during the inauguration of President James Buchanan. He was buried in the Natchez City Cemetery in Natchez, Mississippi.

Legacy
The towns of Quitman, Texas, county seat of Wood County, Texas, Quitman, Mississippi, county seat of Clarke County, Mississippi, Quitman, Georgia, of Brooks County, Georgia, Quitman, Missouri,  of Nodaway County, Missouri; and Quitman County, Georgia & Quitman County, Mississippi, are named after him. The west Texas military installation Fort Quitman was named in his honor. There is a Lodge of Free & Accepted Masons in Ringgold, Georgia, also named after him, Quitman Lodge #106.

See also
 List of United States Congress members who died in office (1790–1899)
 List of United States Congress members killed or wounded in office

Notes

References

Further reading
 
 
 
 
 
 
 
 
 

|-

|-

|-

|-

1798 births
1852 United States vice-presidential candidates
1858 deaths
19th-century American politicians
19th-century American judges
American filibusters (military)
American Fire-Eaters
American Lutherans
American military personnel of the Mexican–American War
American proslavery activists
American slave owners
American white supremacists
Burials in Mississippi
Democratic Party members of the United States House of Representatives from Mississippi
Democratic Party governors of Mississippi
Justices of the Mississippi Supreme Court
Members of the Aztec Club of 1847
Members of the Mississippi House of Representatives
Mississippi lawyers
Mississippi state senators
Mississippi Whigs
Ohio lawyers
People from Rhinebeck, New York
Politicians from Chillicothe, Ohio
Politicians from Natchez, Mississippi
United States Army generals
Whig Party state governors of the United States